Mumbai, Maharashtra, India, is a large city that was formerly known as "Bombay".

Mumbai may also refer to:

Places
 Mumbai Harbour 
 Mumbai City district 
 Mumbai Metropolitan Region 
 Mumbai Regional Congress Committee
 Mumbai Diocese (disambiguation)
 Mumbai Suburban district
 South Mumbai, a city precinct
 Navi Mumbai, a satellite town next to Mumbai

Constituencies
 Mumbai North (Lok Sabha constituency)
 Mumbai North West (Lok Sabha constituency)
 Mumbai North East (Lok Sabha constituency)
 Mumbai North Central (Lok Sabha constituency)
 Mumbai South Central (Lok Sabha constituency)
 Mumbai South (Lok Sabha constituency)

Transportation infrastructure
 Chhatrapati Shivaji International Airport, or Mumbai Airport, an international airport in Mumbai, India
 Navi Mumbai International Airport, an international airport under construction in Navi Mumbai, Maharashtra, India
 Juhu Aerodrome, general aviation airport of Mumbai, India
 Mumbai Central railway station

Sports
 Mumbai F.C. (soccer) football I-League team of Mumbai, India
 Mumbai City FC (soccer) football Super League team of Mumbai, India
 Mumbai cricket team of Mumbai, India

Other uses
 University of Mumbai
 , Indian Navy warship

See also
 
 
 Bombay (disambiguation)
 Mambai (disambiguation)
 Numbay, former name of Jayapura, Indonesia